The Myanmar National Democratic Alliance Army  (MNDAA) is an armed resistance group in the Kokang region, Myanmar (Burma). The army has existed since 1989, having been the first one to sign a ceasefire agreement with the Burmese government. The ceasefire lasted for about two decades.

History
The group was formed on 12 March 1989, after the local Communist Party of Burma leader, Pheung Kya-shin (also spelt Peng Jia Sheng or Phone Kyar Shin), dissatisfied with the communist government, broke away and formed the MNDAA. Along with his brother, Peng Jiafu, they became the new unit in Kokang. The strength of the army is between 1,500 and 2,000 men.

The rebels soon became the first group to agree to a ceasefire with the government troops. Thus the Burmese government refers to the Kokang region controlled by the MNDAA as "Shan State Special Region 1", indicating the MNDAA was the first group in the area of Shan State to sign a ceasefire agreement. After the ceasefire, the area underwent an economic boom, with both the MNDAA and regional Myanmar Armed Forces (Tatmadaw) troops profiting from increased opium harvests and heroin-refining. The area also produces methamphetamine. The MNDAA and other paramilitary groups control the cultivation areas, making them an easy target for drug trafficking and organised crime groups. The Peace Myanmar Group allegedly launders and reinvests MNDAA's drug profits into the legal economy.

2009 Kokang conflict

In August 2009, the Myanmar National Democratic Alliance Army became involved in a violent conflict with the Myanmar Armed Forces. This was the largest outbreak of fighting between ethnic armies and government troops since the signing of the ceasefire 20 years earlier.

As a result of the conflict, the MNDAA lost control of the Kokang Self-Administered Zone, and as many as 30,000 refugees fled to Yunnan province in neighbouring China.

2015 offensive

On 9 February 2015 the MNDAA tried to retake the area, clashing with Burmese government forces in Laukkai. The skirmishes left a total of 47 Government soldiers dead and 73 wounded. After several months of intense conflict, Kokang insurgents had failed to capture Laukkai. Following the incident, the government of China was accused of giving military assistance to the ethnic Kokang soldiers.

2017 clashes
On 6 March 2017, MNDAA insurgents attacked police and military posts in Laukkai, resulting in the deaths of 30 people.

2021 post-coup resistance
Clashes with the Tatmadaw resumed after the military coup, with MNDAA alongside its allies, AA and Ta'ang National Liberation Army, attacking a police station south of Lashio, killing at least 14 police officers and burning the station to the ground. MNDAA and TNLA further launched attacks in multiple locations in Northern Shan State on 4 and 5 May 2021, inflicting heavy casualties on the Myanmar military.

See also 
 Shan State Army

Notes

References

External links
 
 

Rebel groups in Myanmar
Paramilitary organisations based in Myanmar
Kokang
1989 establishments in Myanmar